Macul (Quechua: "to stretch out right hand") is a commune  (smallest administrative subdivision in Chile) of Chile located in the central-eastern part of the Greater Santiago area, bordered by the communes of Ñuñoa to the north, San Joaquín to the west, Peñalolén to the east and La Florida to the south.

It is a predominantly residential and industrial zone, but its activities have been increasing and diversifying, which has forced a gradual change in terms of infrastructure and equipment. Most inhabitants are considered middle class.

History
Macul was one of five indigenous villages located in the region of Ñuñohue prior to the arrival of the Spaniards. Its economy was heavily based on agriculture due to the fertile soil in the area.

By the seventeenth century, the Ñuñoa area kept its agricultural character, however the development of a road system that had strengthened its ties with the city of Santiago began. During the nineteenth century there were a number of changes and developments that modified the purely rural character of Ñuñoa and Macul, some of the more prevalent changes were the construction of railways, housing developments and the enactment of the Autonomous Commune Law.

Since 1930, Ñuñoa has been strengthening its residential character, and due to its very accessible infrastructure for transportation and communications with the rest of the city, it has now developed as a largely industrialized settlement, with a good number of factories making their home in Ñuñoa.

Beginning in 1960, the territory of Macul seizes to be an urban expansion area to the city of Santiago, reaching critical mass and the maximum for developing land as an urban area, reaching its 100% developed status. This proclamation ended in the early 1970s with the opening of the Américo Vespucio Ringroad, allowing for further development.

In 1981, Ñuñoa was subdivided into three communes: Ñuñoa, Peñalolén and Macul. It wasn't until 1984 when Macul officially became a municipality and began to operate. The municipality is now allowed to exercise its authority over the fully urbanized territory of all three communes. Macul had a significant industrial sector before combining with the commune of Ñuñoa.

Since 1992, the municipal authorities are elected every four years via popular vote.

Administration
As a commune, Macul is a third-level administrative division of Chile administered by a municipal council, headed by an alcalde who is elected by popular vote every four years. The 2012-2016 alcalde is Sergio Puyol Carreño (PDC). The communal council has the following members:
 Carlos Herrera Ferrada (PPD)
 Camila Donato Pizarro (PC)
 Eugenio González Amstrong (RN)
 Héctor Soto Gallardo (PDC)
 Ximena Zuleta Dinamarca (PDC)
 Juan Mackenzie Miranda (UDI)
 Iván Gajardo Calderón (PS)
 Yuri Rivera Rivera (PPD)

The commune is divided into twenty neighbourhood units, which are divided into assemblies and include participation from neighbours in the same area or district. They  find solutions for common problems and concerns.

Within the electoral divisions of Chile, Macul is represented in the Chamber of Deputies by Felipe Salaberry (UDI) and Ximena Vidal (PPD) as part of the 25th electoral district, (together with San Joaquín and La Granja). The commune is represented in the Senate by Soledad Alvear (PDC) and Pablo Longueira (UDI) as part of the 8th senatorial constituency (Santiago-East).

Education
The community of Macul is home to the San Joaquín Campus of the Pontifical Catholic University of Chile, which is located on the eastern side of Vicuña Mackenna Avenue. The campus hosts several faculties and featured labs, libraries, casinos and sport fields of excellent quality. Three buildings on campus were designed by architect Alejandro Aravena, the 2016 laureate of the Pritzker Architecture Prize.

Macul is also home to the athletic campus of the University of the Americas called Campus One (Sports Complex UDLA). This campus is the result of the union of ONE, a company of Hans Gildemeister, and Universidad de Las Americas, to promote physical activity within the University community.

Another higher education institution with facilities in Macul is INACAP, which replaced the former facilities of Colón and Tabancura Streets. The INACAP campus is located at the intersection of Vicuña Mackenna Avenue and Escuela Agricola Street.

Attractions
Among the attractions of the commune we can find the Aquatic Club Macul, the Estadio Monumental David Arellano owned by the most popular Chilean football team, Colo-Colo, and the training center of the Chilean football team Juan Pinto Durán. Departmental and Creole restaurant grill "Donde la Cuca" which is characterised by its pleasing atmosphere and live music is one of the biggest night clubs in Santiago, located in Luxor Disco avenue. The Vasquez Palace, also known as "The Macul Castle", is a beautiful palace located in the center of the community, besides being a popular tourist attraction, the palace also serves as the administration's main office.

Demographics
The population fell by 6.8% (8,173 persons) between the 1992 and 2002 censuses.

Stats
Average annual household income: US$49,004 (PPP, 2006)
Population below poverty line: 13.4% (2006)
Regional quality of life index: 80.30, high, 12 out of 52 (2005)
Human Development Index: 0.806, 10 out of 341 (2003)

References

External links
  Municipality of Macul

Populated places in Santiago Province, Chile
Communes of Chile
Geography of Santiago, Chile
Populated places established in 1984